Indivisible is a 2018 American Christian drama film directed by David G. Evans. Starring Sarah Drew, Justin Bruening, Tia Mowry and Eric Close, the film is based on the true story of Darren Turner. It follows an Army chaplain as he struggles to balance his faith and the Iraq War. It was released in the United States on October 26, 2018 by Pure Flix and received mixed-to-positive reviews from critics.

Cast
 Justin Bruening as Darren Turner, an Army Chaplain
 Sarah Drew as Heather Turner, Darren's wife
 Eddie Kaulukukui as Sgt. Carter
 Eric Close as Ltc. Jacobsen
 Tia Mowry as Tonya Lewis, Michael's wife
 Jason Winston George as Michael Lewis
 Madeline Carroll as Amanda Bradley
 Michael O'Neill as Chaplain Rogers
 Skye P. Marshall as Sgt. Shonda Peterson
 Tanner Stine as Lance Bradley

Production
The film shot over the course of 32 days in Memphis, Tennessee, with the Iraq scenes being filmed near Santa Clarita, California, ending in June 2017.

Release
Indivisible premiered on October 5, 2018 at the Orpheum Theatre in Memphis, and was theatrically released in the United States on October 26, 2018.

Box office
In the United States and Canada, Indivisible was released alongside Hunter Killer and Johnny English Strikes Again, and was projected to gross around $3 million from 830 theaters in its opening weekend. It ended up debuting to $1.5 million, finishing #13 at the box-office.

Critical response
On Metacritic, the film has a weighted average score of 53 out of 100, based on 6 critics, indicating "mixed or average reviews". Audiences polled by CinemaScore gave the film an average grade of "A" on an A+ to F scale, while PostTrak reported filmgoers gave it an 82% positive score.

References

External links
 
 

2018 films
American war drama films
Films about Christianity
Films about the United States Army
Films based on biographies
Films shot in Santa Clarita, California
Films shot in Memphis, Tennessee
Pure Flix Entertainment films
2010s English-language films
2010s American films